Trichotoxon is a genus of air-breathing land snails or semislugs, terrestrial pulmonate gastropod mollusks in the family Helicarionidae.

Species
Species:

Trichotoxon heynemanni 
Trichotoxon martensi 
Trichotoxon prestoni

References

 Terrestrial Slugs Web info

 
Helicarionidae
Taxonomy articles created by Polbot